Thomas Plößel (also transliterated Plössel or Ploessel, born 29 April 1988) is a German sailor. Together with Erik Heil, he won bronze medals in the 49er events at the 2016 Summer Olympics and the 2020 Summer Olympics.

References

External links
 
 
 
 

1988 births
Living people
German male sailors (sport)
Sailors at the 2016 Summer Olympics – 49er
Sailors at the 2020 Summer Olympics – 49er
Olympic sailors of Germany
Olympic bronze medalists for Germany
Olympic medalists in sailing
Medalists at the 2016 Summer Olympics
Medalists at the 2020 Summer Olympics
Sportspeople from Oldenburg